In Greek mythology, Cleta (Ancient Greek: Κλήτα Klḗtā means 'the glorious') was one of the Charites (Graces).

The Lakedaemonians, say that the Charites are two, who gave them the names of Cleta and Phaenna. Her name means "renowned".

References

Beauty goddesses
Greek goddesses